Daya Rajasinghe Nadarajasingham (born 26 May 1948) is a Sri Lankan former sports shooter. He competed at the 1972 Summer Olympics and the 1988 Summer Olympics.

References

External links
 

1948 births
Living people
Sri Lankan male sport shooters
Olympic shooters of Sri Lanka
Shooters at the 1972 Summer Olympics
Shooters at the 1988 Summer Olympics
Place of birth missing (living people)
Shooters at the 1970 Asian Games
Shooters at the 1974 Asian Games
Shooters at the 1994 Asian Games
Commonwealth Games competitors for Sri Lanka
Shooters at the 1978 Commonwealth Games
Shooters at the 1990 Commonwealth Games
Asian Games competitors for Sri Lanka
20th-century Sri Lankan people
21st-century Sri Lankan people